Gábor Laurenczy (born 1954) is a Hungarian chemist and academic. He currently heads the Group of Catalysis for Energy and Environment of the École Polytechnique Fédérale de Lausanne.

Life 
Laurenczy was born in 1954, in Békéscsaba, Hungary. He graduated with honors in 1978 from Lajos Kossuth University with a degree in chemistry. He started his academic career in the Department of Inorganic & Analytical Chemistry of Kossuth University in 1978. In 1981 he obtained a Ph.D. in inorganic chemistry with honours, and in 1984 he became an assistant professor.

By 1985 he transferred to Lausanne, Switzerland  and started working for the Department of Inorganic and Analytical Chemistry, University of Lausanne. He was, in 1986 an assistant; from 1987, a first assistant; from 1991, a maître assistant; and, since 1998, a maître d'enseignement et de recherche, teaching general, inorganic and analytical chemistry, and instrumental analysis. In 1991, he obtained his habilitation at the Hungarian Academy of Sciences, with the title "kandidátus".

Since 1997, he is a member of the Editorial Board of the Acta Chimica Hungarica - Models in Chemistry. He was the chairman of the European COST D10 Action: Innovative Methods and Techniques for Chemical Transformation. He represents Switzerland in the Management Committee of the new European COST Action D29: Sustainable/Green Chemistry and Chemical Technology. Since 2002, he is the chairman of the European COST D30 Action: High Pressure Tuning of Chemical and Biochemical Processes.

Research
By developing techniques for measurement at high pressures, he has made significant contributions to the study of chemical reactions in gaseous and liquid phases. For many years he was in charge of European projects focusing on innovative methods and techniques in the field of chemical transformations as well as on optimization of chemical and biochemical processes using high pressure. His recent work and unfailing commitment have led to a patent for high-pressure storage and production of hydrogen from formic acid. Laurenczy headed a team to successfully develop a process for transforming formic acid into hydrogen gas, a method that has been published and currently under industrial development. The process involved two chemical reactions with the first involving the transformation of hydrogen to a less flammable formic acid, and, the second involving the reverse. This development of a catalyst and viable production system for hydrogen is considered revolutionary by his peers because it is now possible to safely store and transport hydrogen gas with less cost.

 kinetics and mechanisms of complex formation in solution
 variable temperature and pressure (up to 2000 bar) IR, UV-vis and NMR spectroscopy
 NMR studies of carbonyl cluster fluxionalities
 catalytic activation of small molecules

References

1954 births
Hungarian chemists
Living people